Patrick Florence O'Driscoll (14 January 1878 – 8 August 1949) was an Irish Clann na Talmhan politician. A farmer by profession, he was elected to Dáil Éireann as a Clann na Talmhan Teachta Dála (TD) for the Cork West constituency at the 1943 general election. He was re-elected at the 1944 general election and did not contest the 1948 general election.

References

1878 births
1949 deaths
Clann na Talmhan TDs
Members of the 11th Dáil
Members of the 12th Dáil
Politicians from County Cork
Irish farmers